Le Bourdet is a commune in the Deux-Sèvres department in the Nouvelle-Aquitaine region in western France.

Sights
The Maraîchine path allows a cultural stroll in the heart of the "Marais Poitevin". It revolves around three interests:

 The preservation of a bovine species typical of the Marais: "the maraîchine";
 A botanical path where you can find most of the plants representative of the Marais;
 A geological route that allows you to discover the geological history of the region in a fun way.

See also
Communes of the Deux-Sèvres department

References

Communes of Deux-Sèvres